Olga Vymetálková (née Blahotová; born 24 January 1976) is a Czech retired tennis player.

She won six singles and 40 doubles titles on the ITF Circuit during her career. On 20 March 2006, Vymetálková reached her best singles ranking of world No. 143. On 13 September 2004, she peaked at No 82 in the WTA doubles rankings.

Vymetálková retired from professional tennis 2012.

WTA career finals

Doubles: 2 (runner-ups)

ITF Circuit finals

Singles: 16 (6–10)

Doubles: 73 (40–33)

External links
 
 

1976 births
Living people
Czech female tennis players